Atalaya natalensis, also called Natal wing-nut, is a species of plant in the family Sapindaceae. It is endemic to the Cape Provinces and KwaZulu-Natal in South Africa.  It is threatened by habitat loss.

References

Flora of the Cape Provinces
Flora of KwaZulu-Natal
natalensis
Vulnerable plants
Taxonomy articles created by Polbot